The Dublin, Wicklow and Wexford Railway (DW&WR) Ariel Class refers to seven 2-2-2WT well tank locomotives built by Neilson and Company and introduced in 1865.

Ordering
In 1864 S. W. Haughton retired as locomotive superintendent of the DW&WR indicating the stress of maintenance of the 30 engines of the DW&WR as a factor, the workload being much greater than in 1849 when he had begun that role for the Dublin and Kingstown Railway (D&KR).

Meikle had six tenders for the supply of between six and eight locomotives with Grendon of Drogheda quoting the highest at £2,000 per unit.  Neilson and Company won with the cheapest quote of £1,564 and initially supplied six locomotives in 1965.  A seventh added at a later date seems to be related to Banshee being exhibited at the 1865 Dublin International Exhibition of Arts and Manufactures.

The engines were given the name of "supernatural personages": Ariel; Elfin; Kate Kearney; Kelpie; Oberon; Titania; and Banshee.

Design
The locomotives used coal as fuel, as opposed to the earliest D&KR engines which burned coke.  They had straight weatherboards and were noted for a generous proportion of brass and copper-topped chimneys.  Known to be painted green in the 1870s they were later painted is what was described as "ugly red" and modified with the fitting of cabs and stove-pipe chimneys.

Murray notes the low power design was little better than the prior Burgoyne class.

Service
 
Unusually for DW&WR locomotives they bore names rather than numbers though this was consistent practice with the previous practice on the D&KR section for which they were designed.

In an incident at  Banshee suffered a burst boiler killing both the fireman and driver.  The locomotive was repaired and was sold to Fisher and Le Fanu.  Oberton and Elfin went to Murphy's Brewery possibly at Bantry and Baltimore respectively.

Murray suggests with their relatively short life and low power they were not a satisfactory investment perhaps evidenced by the fact none were rebuilt and Shepherds almost notes they were likely not successful.

Notes

References

Sources

Further reading 
 

2-2-2WT locomotives
5 ft 3 in gauge locomotives
Railway locomotives introduced in 1865
Scrapped locomotives
Steam locomotives of Ireland